Raymond Holmes may refer to:

 Ray Holmes (1914–2005), British Royal Air Force pilot
 Raymond Holmes (surveyor), Australian surveyor